Room No. 103 (2015) is a Bengali film directed by Aniket Chattopadhyay and produced by Kaustav Roy. This film is comedy with thriller elements.

Plot 
The story of the film revolves around a hotel name Raat Din. Rudra Chatterjee is the manager of the hotel for 33 years. In these 33 years in the hotel he has gathered many experiences. He is narrating four stories in this film.

Cast 
 Soumitra Chatterjee as Rudra Chatterjee
 Jisshu Sengupta
 Anjana Basu
 Priyanka Sarkar
 Rajesh Sharma
 Kanchana Moitra
 Badshah Moitra,
 Rudraprasad Sengupta
 Ankita

See also 
 Bye Bye Bangkok

References

External links 
 

2015 films
Bengali-language Indian films
2010s Bengali-language films
Films directed by Aniket Chattopadhyay